Grjothøi is a mountain in Skjåk Municipality in Innlandet county, Norway. The mountain is surrounded by several other notable mountains including Gjuvkampen to the northeast; Tverrfjellet to the east; Moldulhøi, Sandgrovhøi, and Hesthøi to the southeast, and Hestdalshøgdi to the southwest.

See also
List of mountains of Norway

References

Skjåk
Mountains of Innlandet